The Times Will Suit Them: Postmodern Conservatism in Australia is a 2008 book by the academics Geoff Boucher and Matthew Sharpe. The book argues that for more than a decade Prime Minister John Howard took advantage of international crises and local anxieties to stay in government and significantly reshape Australian public life.  The authors outline a theory that despite its conservative background the Howard Government was postmodernist, skeptical of organised politics and committed to policies based on a relative assessment of Australian cultural values rather than more universal international ideals. These characteristics, casting the government in a "radical conservative" mould, are presented as an explanation for the government's electoral success.

See also
 List of books about John Howard

References

2008 non-fiction books
Allen & Unwin books
Australian non-fiction books
Books about John Howard
Books about politics of Australia